Román Recarte (b. Caracas, June 7, 1987) is a tennis player from Venezuela. He has played multiple seasons of Davis Cup including the 2011 Venezuelan Davis Cup squad.

References

Sources

Living people
1987 births
Tennis players from Caracas
Venezuelan male tennis players
Tennis players at the 2011 Pan American Games
Pan American Games competitors for Venezuela
Tennis players at the 2007 Pan American Games
21st-century Venezuelan people